Kimmo Matti Koskenniemi (born 7 September 1945) is the inventor of finite-state two-level models for computational phonology and morphology. He was a professor of Computational Linguistics at the University of Helsinki, Finland. In the early 1980s Koskenniemi's work became accessible by early adopters such as Lauri Karttunen, Ronald M. Kaplan and Martin Kay, first at the University of Texas Austin, later at the Xerox Palo Alto Research Center.

This application of finite-state transducers to phonology and morphology was initially implemented for Finnish, but it soon proved to be useful for other languages with complex morphology such as Basque  and Swahili.

Bibliography 

 Koskenniemi, Kimmo 1983: Two-level morphology : a general computational model for word-form recognition and production. Publications (Helsingin yliopisto. Yleisen kieliteteen laitos 11)

References

External links
 Koskenniemi’s page at the University of Helsinki
 Koskenniemi, Kimmo, Two-level Morphology: A General Computational Model for Word-Form Recognition and Production, Publications, No. 11, 160 pages, University of Helsinki, Department of General Linguistics (1983). (Available for personal use.)
 Xuxen, Kimmo Koskenniemi and FSMNLP2012 Acknowledgement of Koskeniemmi's work for its use in the creation of the morphological description of Basque and the construction of the spelling checker Xuxen. Blog of the Ixa Group.

Linguists from Finland
Academic staff of the University of Helsinki
Living people
1945 births